Rahimabad (also Romanized as Raḩīmābād) is a village in Arzuiyeh Rural District, in the Central District of Arzuiyeh County, Kerman Province, Iran. At the 2006 census, its population was 60, in 13 families.

References 

Populated places in Arzuiyeh County